Chengde Mountain Resort in Chengde (Manchu:  Halhūn be jailara gurung), is a large complex of imperial palaces and gardens situated in the Shuangqiao District of Chengde in northeastern Hebei province, northern China, about 225 km northeast of Beijing. This resort was frequently used as a summer palace during the Qing dynasty. Because of its vast and rich collection of Chinese landscapes and architecture, the Mountain Resort in many ways is a culmination of all the variety of gardens, pagodas, temples and palaces from various regions of China. In 1994, The Mountain Resort was awarded World Heritage Site status. 

Chengde is one of China's four famous gardens, national relic protection unit and Class 5A Tourist Attractions in China.

Name 
Chengde Mountain Resort is also sometimes called Rehe Xinggong (热河行宫) or Ligong.

History

Built between 1703 and 1792 during the Qing dynasty, the Mountain Resort took 89 years to complete. It is a vast complex of palaces and administrative and ceremonial buildings. Temples of various architectural styles and imperial gardens blend harmoniously into a landscape of lakes, pastureland and forests.

The Kangxi, Qianlong and Jiaqing emperors often spent several months a year here to escape the summer heat in the capital city of Beijing and the palace zone in the southern part of the resort was therefore designed to resemble the Forbidden City in Beijing. It consists of two parts: a court in front, where the emperor received high officials, nobles of various minority nationalities, and foreign envoys; and bed chambers in the rear, which were the imperial family's living quarters, notably the Yanbozhishuang Hall, where the Kangxi Emperor spent a total of 12 summers while the Qianlong Emperor spent 52 summers in the hall during the course of their reign. The Jiaqing and Xianfeng emperors both died while staying at Chengde in 1820 and 1861 respectively.

Climate 
Chengde Mountain Resort is located in the transition zone from warm temperate zone to cold temperate zone. It has semi - temperate, semi - arid continental monsoon climate. It has a large difference in temperature between day and night. In winter, it is cold and has little snow. It has many thundershowers in summer, leading to few hot periods. Chengde Mountain Resort is suitable for traveling in every season, but best from April to October.

Scenic spots
The Mountain Resort is most famous for the 72 scenic spots which were named by the Kangxi and Qianlong emperors. Many of the scenic spots around the resort's lake area were copied from famous landscaped gardens in southern China. For instance, the main building on the Green Lotus Island, "Tower of Mist and Rain," is modeled upon a tower at the Nanhu Lake at Jiaxing in Zhejiang Province.

The resort's plain area also possesses characteristics of the scenery of the Mongolian grasslands. Forested mountains and valleys are dotted with various buildings. This includes a -tall stone Chinese pagoda, one of the tallest in China, built in 1751 during the reign of the Qianlong Emperor. The pagoda is shaped with an octagonal base, while the pagoda's nine stories are decorated with colorful glazed tiles and the steeple is crowned with a gilded round spire.

In December 1994 the Mountain Resort was listed by UNESCO on its list of World Heritage Sites.

Events

The 2018 Women's Bandy World Championship was held at a naturally frozen ice at the lake in the complex.

Gallery

See also
Wenjin Chamber
Putuo Zongcheng Temple
Puning Temple

References

Further reading
Hevia, James Louis. "World Heritage, National Culture, and the Restoration of Chengde." positions: east Asia cultures critique 9, no. 1 (2001): 219-43.
In 1998 Foreign Languages Press published "Imperial Resort at Chengde" to guide English language visitors.

Palaces in China
Chengde
Major National Historical and Cultural Sites in Hebei
Qing dynasty architecture
Royal residences in China
National parks of China
Hill and mountain resorts
AAAAA-rated tourist attractions
World Heritage Sites in China
1703 establishments in China
Bandy venues in China